Cowans Brook is a stream in Aitkin and Kanabec counties, Minnesota, in the United States.  Cowans Brook was named for a lumberjack.

See also
List of rivers of Minnesota

References

Rivers of Aitkin County, Minnesota
Rivers of Kanabec County, Minnesota
Rivers of Minnesota